Marius Aasen (born 13 January 1992) is a Norwegian rally driver.

Career results

WRC results

SWRC results

JWRC results

Drive DMACK Cup results

WRC 2 results

References 

1992 births
Living people
Norwegian rally drivers
World Rally Championship drivers